Skynet 5A is the first in a series of new-generation Skynet military communications satellites, used by the British Ministry of Defence. It was launched aboard an Ariane 5 carrier rocket at 22:03 GMT on 11 March 2007.

Launch
Skynet 5A was one of two payloads orbited by the first Arianespace Ariane 5 launch of 2007. India's INSAT 4B communications satellite was launched on the same rocket.

It was originally planned for launch on 10 March, but due to a problem with a sensor controlling the launch pad water deluge system, the launch was delayed one day.

Construction
Skynet 5A was built by EADS Astrium, who also selected Ariane 5 as the carrier rocket to launch all three Skynet 5-series satellites. Their design is based on the Eurostar E3000 satellite bus.

Use
Skynet 5A is being used to provide secure communications services for the British armed forces and NATO. Skynet 5A had a launch mass of 4.7 tonnes, and operates with a payload power of 5 kilowatts, four times more than the previous-generation Skynet 4 satellites.

It is operated by Paradigm Secure Communications, a commercial organisation which is a wholly owned subsidiary of EADS Astrium, on behalf of the United Kingdom's Ministry of Defence.

Skynet 5A is located at 6 degrees East

References

See also

 Skynet (satellites)

Communications satellites in geostationary orbit
Military satellites
Spacecraft launched in 2007
Satellites using the Eurostar bus
Spacecraft launched by Ariane rockets